Luca Colnaghi (born 14 January 1999) is an Italian racing cyclist, who currently rides for UCI ProTeam .

Major results

2016
 2nd Road race, National Junior Road Championships
 7th Trofeo comune di Vertova
2017
 1st Trofeo Buffoni
 3rd Gran Premio dell'Arno
 4th Trofeo Emilio Paganessi
 5th Montichiari–Roncone
 9th Ronde van Vlaanderen Juniores
2018
 5th Trofeo Città di Brescia
 9th Gran Premio della Liberazione
2019
 6th La Popolarissima
2020
 Giro Ciclistico d'Italia
1st  Points classification
1st Stages 2 & 3
 3rd Road race, National Under-23 Road Championships
2021
 2nd Trofeo Piva
 4th Road race, National Under-23 Road Championships
 5th Per sempre Alfredo
 7th Road race, UCI Road World Under–23 Championships
2022
 5th Trofeo Playa de Palma

References

External links

1999 births
Living people
Italian male cyclists
Sportspeople from Lecco
Cyclists from the Province of Lecco